Central location tests are a type of Quantitative research technique. They are product and communication development or marketing tests performed in controlled environments, contrary to home-user tests, which take place where the products would actually be used. 

A Central Location Test (CLT) is one in which the research is conducted in a location such as a room in a shopping mall. In this instance, consumers would be recruited to participate in a research product at the mall and the research would be conducted and completed at that time.

CLT is mainly used to shortlist one or few from multiple options under consideration.  It can be used for product tasting, advertisements, packages, etc.

Market research